Redlands Adventist Academy (RAA) is a Seventh-day Adventist K-12 school accredited by the Western Association of Schools and Colleges in Redlands, California, United States.

The school is supported by the Southeastern California Conference of Seventh-day Adventists, local churches, tuition and fundraising.  The school is also accredited by the Accrediting Association of Seventh-day Adventist Schools, Colleges, and Universities.

The school is located across the street from Arrowhead Christian Academy.  The school has many extra-curricular activities including band, choir, a handbell program, and after-school sports.  Redlands Adventist Academy's mascot is a bulldog.

Academics
The required curriculum includes classes in the following subject areas: Religion, English, Oral Communications, Social Studies, Mathematics, Science, Physical Education, Health, Computer Applications, Fine Arts, and Electives.

Spiritual aspects
All students take religion classes each year that they are enrolled. These classes cover topics in biblical history and Adventist doctrines. Instructors in other disciplines also begin each class period with prayer or a short devotional thought, many which encourage student input. Weekly, the entire student body gathers together in the auditorium for an hour-long chapel service.
Outside the classrooms there is year-round spiritually oriented programming that relies on student involvement.

See also

 List of Seventh-day Adventist secondary schools
 Seventh-day Adventist education

Notes

External links

Private elementary schools in California
Private middle schools in California
Private high schools in California
Adventist secondary schools in the United States